Gordon Wilson Flats is a residential building in central Wellington, completed in 1959. The building was owned by Housing New Zealand and housed 131 people. It is currently owned by Victoria University of Wellington, and is unoccupied pending a decision on its future.

The Terrace Flats was renamed in honour of government architect Gordon Wilson who died in its final year of construction.

Use as social housing: 1959–2013

The foundation stone for the building was laid on 6 August 1957, with completion in 1959. The complex housed around 130 people.

Earthquake assessment
An engineering firm first reported concerns about the building in April 2010. A later assessment determined that a large person falling on a balcony could cause masonry façades to fall off the building. Housing New Zealand was more concerned about strong wind or an earthquake event, however, and decided to relocate tenants to avoid any problems. "The building is corroding, so it's a progressive deterioration," HNZ assets development general manager Sean Bignell said.

Vacancy, sale and mooted demolition

Tenants had to leave the flats in May 2012, after Housing New Zealand had serious doubts about the building's structural integrity and safety. Tenants were only given seven days notice to leave, a move which was criticised by some MPs, who pointed out the lack of other options for ex-tenants, especially at such short notice. Some tenants said they found the process very stressful, particularly given many of the residents had health problems or were refugees who didn't speak English well.

At the time Housing New Zealand moved tenants out of the building, the organisation said it was determining what to do with the building, and said no decisions had yet been made about its future. Their regional tenancy manager said at the time: "Wellington has a high demand for housing. Our preference is to upgrade the building".

In January 2014, Wellington MP Grant Robertson sought assurances that it would remain as social housing, and said he was worried it would be sold off rather than redeveloped. Housing advocates also pointed out that there was a shortage of social housing in Wellington, especially given the temporary closure of a number of housing complexes for earthquake strengthening.

Sale to Victoria University
In February 2014, Radio New Zealand reported that Housing New Zealand was in negotiations to sell the flats to Victoria University of Wellington. Neither party to the negotiations would comment. Wellington MP Grant Robertson said he was worried social housing was being driven out of the central city.

In September 2014, it was announced that Victoria University of Wellington would purchase the building. The university bought the building because of its proximity to its Kelburn campus, and the potential for it to provide a link between the Terrace and Wai-te-ata Road. The Vice-Chancellor of Victoria University, Grant Guilford, said that the university was in the process of making a decision about whether to demolish the building in consultation with the community. He commented that:

It was subsequently revealed that the purchase price was over $6 million.

In July 2015, Urban Perspectives Limited, on behalf of Victoria University, lodged an application with Wellington City Council to rezone the area from "Inner Residential Area" to "Institutional Precinct", remove the Flats from the City District Plan’s heritage list, and amend the Institutional Precinct provisions of the District Plan.

Evidence presented to the Wellington City Council panel by architectural historian noted the architectural significance of the flats:

In April 2016, a Wellington City Council panel approved the rezoning of the flats, allowing Victoria University to demolish the building and build anything – possibly student accommodation. The media reported that the prospect of noisy student accommodation worried neighbours.

In July 2016, the Architectural Centre lodged an appeal in the Environment Court against the Wellington City Council's decision to remove the Gordon Wilson flats' heritage status under Wellington's District Plan. The  appeal was successful with the court determining that the heritage listing should stand in August 2017. 

In July 2020, the University revealed plans to rezone the site for institutional use, and to demolish the flats in favour of a development including an 'outdoor entrance plaza and new teaching and research facilities'. The new design was to be called Te Huanui, which the university called "a great opportunity for positive inner-city development."

In February 2021, the flats were listed by Heritage New Zealand as a category 1 historic place, meaning any plans to develop the site would need Environment Court approval. Plans for Te Huanui have been "put on hold" since that time.

Reference,

External links

Heritage assessment, produced by wareham cameron + co (May 2015)
Profile of the building, Wellington Architecture Centre
Feature article about the flats, RNZ (August 2018)

Apartment buildings in New Zealand
Buildings and structures in Wellington City
1950s architecture in New Zealand
Brutalist architecture in New Zealand